Raj Paliwar is an Indian politician who was Minister of Labour, Employment & Training of Jharkhand and MLA of the Madhupur constituency for the Bhartiya Janata Party. He is a member of Jharkhand Legislative Assembly.

References

Year of birth missing (living people)
Living people
Bharatiya Janata Party politicians from Jharkhand
Members of the Jharkhand Legislative Assembly
Tilka Manjhi Bhagalpur University alumni